No. 10 Squadron ( or ) was a divebomber squadron of the Finnish Air Force in World War II. The squadron was part of Flying Regiment 1.

Organization

Winter War
1st Flight (1. Lentue)
2nd Flight (2. Lentue)
3rd Flight (3. Lentue)
Detachment Pietarinen (Osasto Pietarinen, training detachment)

Their equipment consisted of 13 Fokker C.Xs. The No. 10 Squadron was disbanded after the Winter War and became the new No. 30 Squadron. However, it re-emerged for a couple of months in late 1941.

Continuation War
1st Flight (1. Lentue)
2nd Flight (2. Lentue)

The equipment consisted of 3 Hawker Hurricanes, 4 Fokker C.VEs, 6 Fokker D.XXIs, and 2 Blackburn Ripon IIs.

Bibliography

External links
Lentolaivue 10

10